The 2020–21 CAF Confederation Cup (officially the 2020–21 Total CAF Confederation Cup for sponsorship reasons) was the 18th edition  of Africa's secondary club football tournament organized by the Confederation of African Football (CAF), under the current CAF Confederation Cup title after the merger of CAF Cup and African Cup Winners' Cup.

The winners of the 2020–21 CAF Confederation Cup will earn the right to play against the winners of the 2020–21 CAF Champions League in the 2021–22 CAF Super Cup.

RS Berkane were the defending champions, but were eliminated in the group stage.

Association team allocation
All 56 CAF member associations may enter the CAF Confederation Cup, with the 12 highest ranked associations according to their CAF 5-Year Ranking eligible to enter two teams in the competition. As a result, theoretically a maximum of 68 teams could enter the tournament (plus 16 teams eliminated from the CAF Champions League which enter the play-off round) – although this level has never been reached.

For the 2020–21 CAF Confederation Cup, the CAF uses the 2016–2020 CAF 5-Year Ranking, which calculates points for each entrant association based on their clubs’ performance over those 5 years in the CAF Champions League and CAF Confederation Cup. The criteria for points are the following:

The points are multiplied by a coefficient according to the year as follows:
2019–20: × 5
2018–19: × 4
2018: × 3
2017: × 2
2016: × 1

Teams
Due to the COVID-19 pandemic, associations may abandon their domestic competitions and select the representatives in CAF club competitions. Associations may register their representatives during the engagement window between 1 September and 20 October 2020. All engaged teams must respect the Club Licensing procedure and cooperate with their respective Associations, as non-licensed clubs would be refused participation.

The following 51 teams from 39 associations entered the competition.
Teams in bold received a bye to the first round.
The other teams entered the preliminary round.

Associations are shown according to their 2016–2020 CAF 5-Year Ranking – those with a ranking score have their rank and score (in parentheses) indicated.

A further 16 teams eliminated from the 2020–21 CAF Champions League enter the play-off round.

Associations which did not enter a team

Associations which did not enter a team initially, but had a team transferred from Champions League

 (Rank: 31 )
 (Rank: 15 )
 (Rank: 15 )

Notes

Schedule
The start of the competition was delayed due to the COVID-19 pandemic. On 1 September 2020, the CAF announced the new schedule. On 10 September 2020, the CAF decided to further delay the preliminary round, originally scheduled for 20–22 November (first legs) and 27–29 November (second legs), and the first round, originally scheduled for 11–13 December (first legs) and 18–20 December (second legs).

The original schedule of the competition, as planned before the pandemic, was as follows.

Qualifying rounds

Preliminary round

First round

Play-off round

Group stage

In each group, teams play against each other home-and-away in a round-robin format. The winners and runners-up of each group will advance to the quarter-finals of the knockout stage.

Group A

Group B

Group C

Group D

Knockout stage

Bracket

Quarter-finals

Semi-finals

Final

Top goalscorers

See also
2020–21 CAF Champions League
2022 CAF Super Cup

References

External links
CAFonline.com

2020–21
 
2
2
Association football events postponed due to the COVID-19 pandemic